Harposporium is a genus of anamorphic fungi within the Ophiocordycipitaceae family.

Species
Harposporium anguillulae
Harposporium angulare
Harposporium angustisporum
Harposporium arcuatum
Harposporium arthrosporum
Harposporium baculiforme
Harposporium botuliforme
Harposporium bredonense
Harposporium bysmatosporum
Harposporium cerberi
Harposporium cocleatum
Harposporium crassum
Harposporium cycloides
Harposporium cylindrosporum
Harposporium diceraeum
Harposporium dicorymbum
Harposporium drechsleri
Harposporium helicoides
Harposporium janus
Harposporium leptospira
Harposporium lilliputanum
Harposporium microsporale
Harposporium microsporum
Harposporium multiformis
Harposporium oxycoracum
Harposporium reniforme
Harposporium rhynchosporum
Harposporium sicyodes
Harposporium sinense
Harposporium spirosporum
Harposporium subuliforme
Harposporium thaumasium
Harposporium trigonosporum

External links
Index Fungorum

Sordariomycetes genera
Ophiocordycipitaceae